Dale Owen Bennett (born 6 January 1990) is an English retired professional footballer, who played as a defender.

Career
Bennett began his career at English Football League Championship side Watford in the side's academy system. He captained the U-18 side, and signed professionally in March 2008. He made his first-team debut for Watford as a 71st-minute substitute in a 1–0 victory over West Ham United in the League Cup on 23 September 2008.

In November 2008 Bennett joined Conference National side Kettering Town on a month-long loan, which was later extended to the rest of the season. Bennett made his first Football League appearance for Watford in their 1–0 win against Barnsley in September 2009, following an injury to captain Jay DeMerit. Bennett's attitude in training and matches was praised by his manager Malky Mackay, and he retained his place in the team for the following game against Plymouth Argyle, where the team again won 1–0.

Bennett's next run of regular first-team football came in April 2010, when he played in all six games, initially in place of DeMerit, and later Lloyd Doyley. Mackay commented that Bennett was improving as he gained experience. His contract was subsequently extended until the end of the 2010–11 season. At the end of Watford's 2010–11 campaign, the club exercised its option and signed Bennett through the 2012–2013 season. On 27 October 2011, Bennett joined Brentford on a month's loan. He scored his first career goal on his Brentford debut, the winner in a 2–1 win over Chesterfield on 29 October 2011. This proved to be his only appearance for the Bees as injury ruled him out of all other games during his loan spell. Once recovered from his injury, Bennett re-joined Brentford on loan on 1 January 2012 for 28 days. He made four appearances before returning to Watford. Bennett made his first start for Watford in the 2011–12 season away to West Ham United on 7 March 2012. He had to be stretchered off in the second half due to a clash of heads with John Eustace leaving him concussed and not able to continue.

On 31 August 2012, he signed a one-month loan deal with AFC Wimbledon, this was extended for another month on 5 October. AFC Wimbledon manager Neal Ardley announced on 28 October that he would be releasing Bennett on account of injury. On 22 November 2012, Bennett joined League One side Yeovil Town on loan until January 2013. He made his Yeovil Town debut as a substitute in their 3–1 defeat against Carlisle United but this was Bennett's only appearance for the club as he returned to Watford on 8 December due to a back injury.

On 24 January 2013, Bennett joined Forest Green Rovers on a two-and-a-half-year deal, linking up with former teammate, Eddie Oshodi. After overcoming an injury that he arrived with, he made his Forest Green debut on 9 February 2013 in a 1–1 draw at Kenilworth Road against Luton Town. He scored his goal for Forest Green with a dramatic stoppage time equaliser in a 3–3 home draw against Lincoln City on 1 November 2014, Lincoln had led 3–0 with less than half an hour to go. On 5 March 2015, he agreed a new one-year contract with Forest Green that would keep him at the club until the summer of 2016. His second goal for the club came in a 3–1 away win over Barnet on 7 March 2015. His next goal for Forest Green saw him find the net in a 3–1 home win over Macclesfield Town on 11 April 2015.

He was a part of a Forest Green side who reached the Conference National play-offs for the first time at the end of the 2014–15 season, playing in both legs of a semi-final defeat against Bristol Rovers. The following 2015–16 campaign saw him make his hundredth league appearance for Forest Green in a 1–1 away draw at Tranmere Rovers on 19 March 2016. He ended the season playing in the 2015–16 National League play-off final at Wembley Stadium, but ended up on the losing side, suffering a 3–1 defeat against Grimsby Town. The following season he played again in the 2016–17 National League play-off final, helping Forest Green earn promotion to the Football League for the first time in their history with a 3–1 win over Tranmere Rovers.

In June 2018, he returned to the National League, signing a two-year contract with Sutton United. At the end of his first season with the club he won a clean sweep of awards as Club Player of the Year, Players' Player of the Year and Supporters' Player of the Year. On 17 October 2019 the club confirmed, that injuries had forces 29-year old Bennett to retire immediately.

Personal life
Bennett is of Trinidadian, Grenadian and Jamaican descent through his grandparents, and declared interest in representing the Trinidad and Tobago national football team.

Dale has recently turned vegan following his return from his honeymoon in June 2017.

Bennett was also in the process of obtaining the required documentation to represent the Grenadian National Football Team.

Career statistics

References

External links
 
 
 
 Profile on Sky Sports

1990 births
Living people
English footballers
English sportspeople of Trinidad and Tobago descent
English sportspeople of Grenadian descent
English sportspeople of Jamaican descent
Association football defenders
Watford F.C. players
Wealdstone F.C. players
Kettering Town F.C. players
Brentford F.C. players
AFC Wimbledon players
Yeovil Town F.C. players
Forest Green Rovers F.C. players
Sutton United F.C. players
English Football League players
National League (English football) players